Pavel Bartoș (born 20 January 1975 Miercurea Ciuc, Romania) is a Romanian actor and television presenter, known for hosting Românii au talent (Romanian's Got Talent) and The Voice of Romania.

Also the presenter was chosen by Disney Pixar to provide the Romanian voice of Randall in Monsters, Inc. and Monsters University. Also was chosen to dubbed characters in other animations:

 Megamind - Megamind
 Sing - Eddie
 Secret Life of Pets - Duke

Awards and nominations
 Nominalizare la Marele Premiu la Gala Premiul Hystrion pentru interpretare- Festivalul de Arta Insolita, Cluj (1994)
 Marele Premiu la Gala Tânărului Actor, Costinești (1998, 1999)
 Nominalizare la Premiul de interpretare al Festivalului Teatrelor Minoritare din România (2001)

References

External links
 Pavel Bartoș: „Smiley a fost o mare surpriză“, 10 May 2011, Florina Tecuceanu, Adevărul

1975 births
Living people
People from Miercurea Ciuc
Romanian male film actors
Romanian male television actors
Romanian male voice actors
Romanian male stage actors
Romanian television presenters